Fiesta is an album by French Eurodance group Miranda, released in November 1999 by Universal Records in Europe.

Track listing

Release history

References

1999 albums
Miranda (group) albums